3554 Amun is an M-type Aten asteroid (meaning it crosses Earth's orbit) and a Venus-crosser. It was discovered on 4 March 1986 by Carolyn  and Eugene Shoemaker at Mount Palomar Observatory. Its estimated diameter is 3.341 kilometers, making it one of the smallest known M-type asteroids. Amun was the fifth Aten asteroid to be numbered.

Amun was once considered metallic, based on its M-type spectrum.  In Mining the Sky, planetary scientist John S. Lewis calculated the value of 3554 Amun at $20 trillion.

(6178) 1986 DA is another M-type near-Earth asteroid with lower inclination that is actually metallic.

Amun passes closest to Venus, and in 1964, 2034, and 2103 comes within 10 Gm of it.

References

External links 
 Economic value of asteroid 3554 Amun
 
 
 

003554
Discoveries by Eugene Merle Shoemaker
Discoveries by Carolyn S. Shoemaker
Named minor planets
Earth-crossing asteroids
19860304